Harold Charles Deutsch (June 7, 1904 – May 15, 1995) was an American military historian who focused on World War II. During the Second World War, he served as head of research for the Office of Strategic Services.

Life 
Deutsch was born in Milwaukee, Wisconsin. He was a graduate of the University of Wisconsin (B.A., M.A.) and Harvard University (M.A., Ph.D.). In Europe he studied at the University of Paris, the University of Vienna and the University of Berlin. He was a professor of history  at the University of Minnesota. Deutsch joined the US Army War College's Strategic Studies Institute as a political scientist. During the Second World War he was chief of the Political Subdivision for Europe, Africa, and the Middle East of the Office of Strategic Services.

Works 
Deutsch, Harold C., and Dennis E. Showalter What If: The Might-Have-Beens of World War II  Chicago, Ill: Emperor's Press, 1997.
Deutsch, Harold C., and Dennis E. Showalter. If the Allies Had Fallen: Sixty Alternate Scenarios of World War II. New York: Skyhorse Publishing, Inc, 2012. 
Deutsch, Harold C. Hitler and His Generals: The Hidden Crisis, January–June 1938. Minneapolis, Minn: University of Minnesota Press, 1974.
The Conspiracy Against Hitler in the Twilight War
Hitler and His Generals: The Hidden Crisis, January–June 1938, 1974
The Historical Impact of Revealing The Ultra Secret, 1977
The Influence of ULTRA on World War II, 1978
The Genesis of Napoleonic Imperialism, Harvard University Press (1938).

References 

1904 births
1995 deaths
Writers from Milwaukee
University of Minnesota faculty
University of Wisconsin–Madison alumni
Harvard University alumni
United States Army War College faculty
People of the Office of Strategic Services
American military historians
Historians from Wisconsin